Alfred Henry Scott ( 1840 – 28 May 1872) was a bartender and clerk at the Red River Colony community of Saint Boniface, Manitoba, and was noted for having been selected as a delegate to represent the provisional government of Louis Riel in negotiations with the Government of Canada during the Red River Rebellion of 1869–1870.

External links 
Biography from the Dictionary of Canadian Biography Online

1840s births
1872 deaths
People of the Red River Rebellion
Politicians from Winnipeg
Members of the Legislative Assembly of Assiniboia

People from Saint Boniface, Winnipeg